Campion is a British mystery television series which first aired on the BBC in two series between 1959 and 1960. It is adaptation of two novels by Margery Allingham, Dancers in Mourning (1937) and Death of a Ghost (1934) featuring the fictional detective Albert Campion. Bernard Horsfall played the title role.

Other actors appearing in the first series include Denis Quilley, Michael Gough, Noel Howlett, Vanda Godsell, Richard Pearson, Olive Sloane, Sheila Burrell and Wally Patch. The second series featured Mary Merrall, Andre Van Gyseghem, Arthur Brough and Shay Gorman.

References

Bibliography
Ellen Baskin. Serials on British Television, 1950-1994. Scolar Press, 1996.

External links
 
 

BBC television dramas
1959 British television series debuts
1960 British television series endings
English-language television shows
Television shows based on British novels